Comandante Armando Tola International Airport  is an airport in Santa Cruz Province, Argentina. The airport is jointly operated by the government and London Supply. Currently, the airport is served by Aerolíneas Argentinas, DAP and LADE. It is the westernmost Argentinian airport served by scheduled flights.

The airport was inaugurated in November 2000, replacing the old Lago Argentino Airport (ING/SAWL). It is now the main entrance to Los Glaciares National Park. The airport's design was created by Uruguayan-Canadian architect Carlos Ott.  In 2010, the airport was used by over 500,000 passengers.

It was the departure and landing station for the second stage of Perlan Project.

Airlines and destinations

Statistics

Gallery

See also

Transport in Argentina
List of airports in Argentina

References

External links 
 Official website
 London Supply Group
 
 

Airports in Santa Cruz Province, Argentina
Carlos Ott buildings